The Bulgarian Ambassador to the United States is the official representative of the Government of Bulgaria to the Government of the United States in Washington, D.C. Diplomatic relations between the two countries were established in 1903.

List of representatives

References 

 
United States
Bulgaria